James Cutler Milliman (January 28, 1847 – January 21, 1933) was an American politician.

Born in Saratoga County, New York, Milliman served in the Union Army during the American Civil War. He then moved to Logan, Iowa where he worked in real estate. Milliman served in the Iowa House of Representatives and as Lieutenant Governor of Iowa, serving from 1898 until 1902. Later, he served as Mayor of Logan, Iowa. He died in Santa Monica, California.

References

1847 births
1933 deaths
People from Galway, New York
People of New York (state) in the American Civil War
People from Logan, Iowa
Mayors of places in Iowa
Lieutenant Governors of Iowa
Republican Party members of the Iowa House of Representatives